Dalader is the type genus of coreid bugs in the tribe Daladerini; they are from Asia, chiefly Southeast Asia. This plant bug genus is distinguished by the which preterminal antennal segment being flattened, pear-shaped, and ridged and the terminal segment being paler. Chalcidoid egg parasites have been recorded from this species. Adults of Dalader acuticosta are fried and eaten in northeastern India.

Species
 D. acuticosta Amyot & Serville, 1843
 D. anthracinus Bergroth, 1912
 D. distanti Blöte, 1938
 D. formosanus Esaki, 1931
 D. horsfieldi Distant, 1900
 D. planiventris (Westwood, 1842)
 D. pulchrus Brailovsky, 2005
 D. rubiginosus (Westwood, 1842)
 D. shelfordi Distant, 1900
 D. spinulicollis (Breddin, 1909)
 D. sumatrensis Schmidt, 1909- D. sumatrensis elatus Blöte, 1938

References

External links 
 Coreoidea database

Coreinae
Coreidae genera
Hemiptera of Asia